Brenham High School is a public high school located in the city of Brenham, Texas, United States. It is classified as a 5A school by the UIL.  It is a part of the Brenham Independent School District located in central Washington County.   In 2015, the school was rated "Met Standard" by the Texas Education Agency.

Athletics
The Brenham Cubs compete in volleyball, cross country, football, basketball, swimming, soccer, golf, tennis, track, baseball, and softball.

State titles
Baseball - 
1970 (3A), 1975 (4A), 1976 (4A), 1986 (4A), 1987 (4A), 1988 (4A), 2010 (4A)
Girls' golf - 
1983 (4A)
Softball - 
1996 (4A), 2005 (4A)
Boys' track - 
1952 (1A), 1953 (1A), 1977 (3A)
Girls' track - 
1979 (3A), 1980 (3A), 1987 (4A)

State Finalist
 Football - 
2002 (4A/D2), 2009 (4A/D2), 2013 (4A/D2)

Notable alumni

 Malcom Brown (Class of 2012), professional football player
 Cecil Cooper (Class of 1967), professional baseball player
 Lois Kolkhorst (Class of 1982), state politician, state representative from Brenham from 2001-2015, and state senator since 2015
 Roosevelt Leaks (Class of 1971), professional football player
 Chuck Machemehl (Class of 1964), professional baseball player
 Frank Malina (Class of 1930), aeronautical engineer, rocket researcher, artist
 Teaira McCowan (Class of 2015), WNBA player
 Gus Franklin Mutscher (Class of 1950), state politician, former Speaker of the Texas House of Representatives (1969-1972)
 Joe Routt, professional football player, Bronze Star Medal recipient, posthumous hall of fame inductee (College Texas Sports: 1952, National Football: 1962)
 Ricky Seilheimer (Class of 1978), professional baseball player
 Limas Sweed (Class of 2003), professional football player
 Wilson Whitley (Class of 1973), professional football player
 Courtland Sutton (Class of 2014), professional football player

References

External links
 

Public high schools in Texas
Schools in Washington County, Texas
Buildings and structures in Brenham, Texas